The  Field Artillery Regiment "a Cavallo" is a field artillery regiment of the Italian Army. The regiment is the heir to all Italian Army horse artillery units and maintains a mounted section with historic horse-drawn field guns. Today the regiment is based in Vercelli in Piedmont and Milan in Lombardy. The regiment is operationally assigned to the Cavalry Brigade "Pozzuolo del Friuli" and provides artillery support to the Italian Armed Forces' National Sea Projection Capability.

History 
The horse artillery batteries were established up on 8 April 1831 in Venaria Reale as light artillery in support to the cavalry units. The batteries participated in the wars of independence.

On 1 November 1887 the Horse Artillery Regiment was established in Milan, bringing together the two horse battery brigades set up in 1883 at the 8th Field Artillery Regiment and the 3rd brigade established in 1887.

1915 - 1919 
On May 24, 1915, the four groups of mounted batteries took part in the operations together with the four cavalry divisions that accompanied:
 I Group: 1st and 2nd Horse Artillery Batteries;
 II Group: 3rd and 4th Horse Artillery Batteries;
 III Group: 5th and 6th Horse Artillery Batteries;
 IV Group: 7th and 8th Horse Artillery Batteries.

The Groups were brought together to form the Horse Artillery Regiment, and were employed in Cervignano, Villesse, the Isonzo crossing, Monte Sei Busi, Monfalcone, Sagrado.

Once the war was stabilized, the Horse Artillery Batteries were temporarily used for coastal and anti-aircraft defence near Aquileia, San Giorgio di Nogaro and lower Tagliamento.

In May 1916, the Groups were sent to the front with their respective cavalry divisions on foot, taking up positions in reduced formation at Monte Udern, San Jacob and Monfalcone.

In October 1916, the Groups moved to the dependencies of various infantry divisions where the need arose for an artillery reinforcement. They occupied difficult and highly beaten positions in Gorizia, Ciprianisce, Oppacchiasella and Nova Vas.

In 1917 the Regiment was reunited. The 1st Group occupied positions at Crni Krib, at the Pietra Rossa lake, at an altitude of 235 metres. The II Group was in Opacchiasella until May. From May to August it was in training on horseback with the 2nd Cavalry Division, then, once again on foot, it was in Gorizia and before Tolmino. The III Group held positions in Lukatic, Nad Bregom, Nova Vas, Segeti and Opacchiasella until October. The IV Group was in Opacchiasella, Monfalcone and Gorizia.

At the Battle of Caporetto in October 1917, the Regimental Command with I and III Groups were on the Carso at an altitude of 208 south; the II Group was in front of Tolmino and the IV Group was in Salcano di Gorizia. On 24 October 1917 the II Group was surrounded by overwhelming Austrian forces while it was carrying out the fire. The other groups with the Regimental Command retreated to the Tagliamento where they took up positions to contain the enemy advance.

Between the Tagliamento and the Piave, the I and III Groups supported the cavalry divisions in charge of covering the retreat of the bulk of the army. Once the Piave defensive line was reached, the Batteries took up positions on Montello.

In 1918, the mounted batteries joined their respective cavalry divisions. In June 1918, the II Group was engaged in Monastier di Treviso against the Austro-Hungarian forces that had crossed the Piave. Once repulsed the Austro-Hungarian offensive, the Groups left the cavalry divisions and the Regiment was assembled and sent to the Asiago plateau. There, it occupied the positions of Campo Rossignolo, Bosco di Gallio, Cima Eckar and Monte Valbella, where it participated in all the fights that took place in that period in that sector.

In early October 1918, in anticipation of the Italian offensive, the groups were again assigned to the cavalry divisions. On 29 October 1918 the Piave was forded, starting the pursuit of the enemy forces.

1934 - 1945 
On 1 October 1934 the Regiment was disestablished to give life with its Groups to the Celere Artillery Regiments (1st, 2nd and 3rd Celere Artillery Regiments).

The 1st Celere Artillery Regiment arrived in Libya in February 1941, with two motorized Groups, after valiant actions in cooperation with the infantry, was officially dissolved for war events on 27 November 1942.

The 2nd Celere Artillery Regiment, which arrived in Tripoli on 14 January 1941, with two motorized Groups, was overwhelmed after a year of fighting and 59 days of siege.

The 3rd Celere Artillery Regiment, landed in Tripoli in February 1941, with two motorized Groups, sacrificed itself in an unequal fight between 24 October and 4 November 1942.

The Horse Artillery Regiment, reconstituted in July 1941 by bringing together the horse Groups of the Celere Artillery Regiments, was sent, together with the 201st Motorized Artillery Regiment with counter-tank tasks, to the Russian front where it immolated men, horses and cannons side by side of the soldiers, of the cavalrymen of the Regiment "Savoia Cavalleria" (3rd) and of the lancers of the Regiment "Lancieri di Novara" (5th) of the 3rd Celere Division.

1946 - present 
The Horse Artillery Regiment was reconstituted in Milan on 20 November 1946 as Horse Cavalry Regiment "Legnano".

In 1954 the official designation changed to Army Corps Self-propelled Horse Artillery Regiment. In 1957 the Regiment was designated Self-propelled Anti-tank Horse Artillery Regiment and, in 1961, Self-propelled Horse Artillery Regiment. In 1963 it returned to the original and current denomination of Artillery Regiment "a Cavallo".

From 1 December 1997 to 2005 the regiment was framed within the Group then the Artillery Brigade.

In 2005, the Regiment was transferred to the Cavalry Brigade "Pozzuolo del Friuli".

Current Structure

As of 2019 the Field Artillery Regiment "a Cavallo" consists of:

  Regimental Command, in Vercelli
 Command and Logistic Support Battery, in Vercelli
 Surveillance, Target Acquisition and Tactical Liaison Battery, in Vercelli
 1st Howitzer Group "M.O. Gioacchino Bellezza", in Vercelli
 1st Howitzer Battery
 2nd Howitzer Battery
 3rd Howitzer Battery
 Fire and Technical Support Battery 
 2nd Horse Group "M.O. Sergio Bresciani", in Milan
 Historical Mounted Section
 Mounted Batteries Military Equestrian Center
 Mounted Batteries Museum

The Command and Logistic Support Battery fields the following sections: C3 Section, Transport and Materiel Section, Medical Section, and Commissariat Section. The 1st Howitzer Group is equipped with FH-70 towed howitzers, while the 2nd Horse Group's Historical Mounted Section is equipped with horse-drawn 75/27 Mod. 1912 guns. The Surveillance, Target Acquisition and Tactical Liaison Battery is equipped with RQ-11B Raven unmanned aerial vehicles and ARTHUR counter-battery radars.

Unit decorations 
The three Silver Medals of Military Valour awarded to the regiment in World War II for its service with the Italian Army in Russia and the Silver Medal of Military Valour awarded to the Fast Artillery Regiment (3rd) for its service with the 133rd Armoured Division "Littorio" in the Western Desert Campaign are affixed to the regiment's standard and displayed on the regiment's coat of arms. Additionally the regiment's standard also carries temporarily the Gold Medal of Military Valour and the Bronze Medal of Military Valour awarded to Fast Artillery Regiment (1st) for its service with the 27th Infantry Division "Brescia" in the Western Desert Campaign, and the Silver Medal of Military Valour awarded to 201st Motorized Artillery Regiment for its service with the Italian Army in Russia.

See also 
 Cavalry Brigade "Pozzuolo del Friuli"

External links
Italian Army Website: Reggimento Artiglieria Terrestre "a Cavallo"

References

Military units and formations established in 1887
Military units and formations disestablished in 1934
Military units and formations established in 1946
Artillery Regiments of Italy